Charles Jundt (1880 in Alsace-Lorraine  1945) was a New York City coiffeur who founded the Charles of the Ritz line of cosmetics products.

Biography 
Jundt came to New York in 1916 via Paris and London and took over the beauty salon of the Ritz-Carlton Hotel. He became an American citizen in 1921. By 1926, he was marketing beauty products under the name Charles of the Ritz. He had a wife, Anna, and a daughter, Ethel.

In 1932, Adeita de Beaumont Fisher, the estranged wife of cartoonist Bud Fisher, was awarded $5,000 damages after Jundt burned Fisher's ear while styling her hair.

References

20th-century American businesspeople
1880 births
1945 deaths
German emigrants to the United States